Cantus Arcticus, Op. 61, is a 1972 orchestral composition by the Finnish composer Einojuhani Rautavaara. It is one of his best-known works.

Subtitled Concerto for Birds and Orchestra, it incorporates tape recordings of birdsong recorded near the Arctic Circle, and on the bogs of Liminka, in northern Finland.

The work is in three movements: The bog opens with a flute duet, after which the other woodwinds join in, followed by the birds. The second movement, Melancholy, features a slowed-down recording of the song of the shore lark. The final movement, Swans migrating, takes the form of a long crescendo for orchestra, with the sounds of whooper swans. At the end both birdsong and orchestra fade, as if into the distance.

Cantus Arcticus was commissioned by the University of Oulu for its first doctoral degree ceremony and premièred on 18 October 1972 with Stephen Portman conducting.

References

External links
Fennica Gehrman home page (Publisher)

Compositions by Einojuhani Rautavaara
1972 compositions
Concertos
University of Oulu
Culture of the Arctic
Commissioned music